Daniel Kearns (born 15 April 1975) is an Irish menswear designer with a master's degree in menswear from the Royal College of Art. He has held menswear designer positions at Alexander Mc Queen and John Galliano. From 2005-2010 he was Design Director of menswear at Alexander McQueen and in March 2011 he was made menswear Design Director at Yves Saint Laurent. Kearns has consulted for Zegna, Louis Vuitton and Roberto Cavalli, he was made Artistic Director of French Brand Faconnable in 2013. He left his position at Faconnable in April 2015. Kearns was appointed Creative Director of Kent & Curwen in 2016, the British sporting brand that is relaunching with David Beckham.In June 2020 Kearns was made Group Creative Director of Trinity Brands overseeing the creative studios of Gieves & Hawkes, Cerruti 1881 as well as Kent & Curwen.

Early career and education

Kearns grew up in Dublin, Ireland. Kearns earned a BA in Fashion Design from the National College of Art and Design in Dublin in 1997, and during his time there, he also completed a tailoring apprenticeship with Louis Copeland.

This fueled Kearns's interest in tailoring, and prompted a move to London in 1997 where he undertook a master's degree in menswear at the Royal College of Art, alongside a research project at the college focused on the development of ergonomic tailoring with intelligent textiles incorporating Shape Memory Alloy. This led to a collaboration with Yorkshire mill Bower Roebuck & Co, who produced samples of the textile.

While at the Royal College of Art, Kearns won a Dolce & Gabbana menswear project in 1998, which resulted in a three-month stint at the fashion house working on both mainline and the D&G line.

After graduating in 2000, Kearns was named Menswear Designer at Emanuel Ungaro, after which he was brought in to help launch John Galliano menswear as Head of Menswear from 2002 until 2005.

Alexander McQueen

Kearns was Design Director of Menswear from 2005 until 2010. During that time, he worked closely with Alexander McQueen on every menswear show until his last show in January 2010, while also developing and expanding the identity of the menswear ready-to-wear and accessories collections, to great critical acclaim.

Louis Vuitton

In January 2010, Kearns was named Designer for the Outdoor Department for Louis Vuitton. Here, he designed a capsule range for the Travel Room entitled ‘Made for Travel’, as well as the L.V. Trophy sea collection.

Yves Saint Laurent

In March 2011, Kearns was hired by Yves Saint Laurent to overlook its menswear collection as Design Director.

Faconnable

In 2013, Kearns was hired by Façonnable to overlook its menswear and womenswear collections as Artistic Director.

Kent & Curwen

In 2016, Kearns was appointed as Creative Director of the British heritage menswear brand Kent & Curwen. Daniel works closely with the company investor David Beckham, working collaboratively together to steer Kent & Curwen into this new generation.

Personal life

Kearns has spent several years in Paris and moved in 2016 back to London with his family. He has two children Bailey and Beatrice.

References 

1975 births
Irish fashion designers
Businesspeople from Dublin (city)
Alumni of the Royal College of Art
Alumni of the National College of Art and Design
Living people
Menswear designers